Ma Rong (79–166), courtesy name Jichang, was a Chinese poet and politician of the Eastern Han dynasty. He was born in Youfufeng in the former Han capital region, in modern Xianyang, Shaanxi Province. His father Ma Yan (马严) was a son of Ma Yu (马余), an elder brother of the famed general Ma Yuan. He was known for his commentaries on the books on the Five Classics, and the first scholar known to have done this. He also developed the double column commentary while doing it. His notable students were Lu Zhi and Zheng Xuan.

He was suspended for ten years due to critical comments. Eventually he was restored to the Governor of Nan Commandery (modern Hubei). His biography appears in the Book of Later Han (volume 60, part 1). He wrote the Rhapsody on Long Flute; the Song dynasty Classic of Loyalty, patterned after the Classic of Filial Piety, bears attribution to his name.

References

  王煦华, 马融. Encyclopedia of China (Chinese History Edition), 1st ed.
  费振刚, 马融. Encyclopedia of China (Chinese Literature Edition), 1st ed.

79 births
166 deaths
Chinese Confucianists
Han dynasty essayists
Han dynasty poets
Han dynasty politicians from Shaanxi
Poets from Shaanxi
Politicians from Xianyang
Writers from Xianyang
2nd-century Chinese philosophers